= Gerald Quentin Maguire =

Gerald Quentin Maguire Jr from the KTH Royal Institute of Technology in Kista, Stockholm, Sweden was named Fellow of the Institute of Electrical and Electronics Engineers (IEEE) in 2013 for contributions to mobile networks and cognitive radio systems. Also in 2013, he was elected a member of the Academia Europaea.
